Chemsakia is a genus of beetles in the family Cerambycidae, containing the following species:

 Chemsakia semicostata (Bates, 1872)
 Chemsakia subarmata Linsley, 1967

References

Trachyderini
Cerambycidae genera